Joseph Dysart (July 8, 1820 – September 8, 1893) was an American farmer and politician.

Born in Huntingdon, Pennsylvania, Dysart moved to Iowa and eventually settled in the community of Dysart, Iowa, which was named after him. Dysart was a farmer; he served in the Iowa State Senate from 1861 to 861 and from 1870 to 1874. He was elected Lieutenant Governor of Iowa in 1873. He died in Dysart, Iowa.

Notes

1820 births
1893 deaths
People from Huntingdon, Pennsylvania
People from Tama County, Iowa
American city founders
Farmers from Iowa
Iowa state senators
Lieutenant Governors of Iowa
19th-century American politicians